Killer Bees is a 1974 American made-for-television horror film starring Gloria Swanson. Directed by Curtis Harrington, the cast includes Kate Jackson, Craig Stevens, John Getz, and Edward Albert. The film originally aired as the ABC Movie of the Week on February 26, 1974.

Plot

Edward Van Bohlen is estranged from his family and their wine making business. His new girlfriend, Victoria Wells, has convinced him to return to the family at their winery near San Francisco to reconcile despite Edward's warning that his family is eccentric and reclusive. Victoria is treated coolly by the family, but she nevertheless becomes involved in the family power struggle.

Victoria discovers that the family has been using the Africanized bee strain to improve yields at the winery.

Madame Van Bohlen, a strong-willed woman and matriarch of her family, runs the family wine business. Her family refers to her as "Madame." She also has a  psychic link which allows her control over the swarm of killer bees that reside in her vineyard. Van Bohlen serves as the queen of the hive.

Victoria discovers that Van Bohlen is using this power to kill people she perceives as a threat, but the family appears to refuse to accept this.

Van Bohlen dies under mysterious circumstances, and although law enforcement is highly suspicious, they are unable to obtain a search warrant to investigate further and close the case. Victoria and Edward plan to leave the family and return to their life as soon as the funeral is over.

During the  Van Bohlen funeral, the bees attack the church, Victoria is cut off and shepherded by the bees into the attic housing their main hives;  however, they do not attack Victoria.

Rather than leave, Victoria returns to the winery, now accepted as the queen both by the family, who now call her Madame, and the swarm.

Cast
 Gloria Swanson as Madame Van Bohlen
 Kate Jackson as Victoria Wells
 Edward Albert as Edward Van Bohlen
 John Getz as Attendant
 Craig Stevens as Rudolf Van Bohlen
 Don McGovern as Mathias Van Bohlen
 Roger Davis as Dr. Helmut Van Bohlen
 John S. Ragin as Sergeant Jeffreys
 Liam Dunn as Zeb Tucker
 Heather Ann Bostain as Roseanna / Housekeeper
 Donald Gentry as Lineman
 Jack Perkins as Salesman
 Robert L. Balzer as Minister
 Daniel Woodwort as Townsman
 George Deangelis as Foster

Reception

Moria found the effects disappointing and the plot dull. It stats that much of the movie keeps the bees off screen and focuses on the family drama instead. However, the twist ending was found to be interesting. The New York Times found the movie a tedious bore, stating the commercials advertising the movie to be more interesting that the film itself.

SF Weekly was kinder to the film. While it found that the effects are laughable, the scenes where Jackson and Swanson allow real bees to crawl on them to be creepy. It also liked the musical score by David Shire and that it avoids many of the clichés that other killer bee movies contain. It does point out that many questions such as how the link with the bees exists remain unanswered

Home Release

Available, as of July 2021, to stream on many services, including YouTube.

Awards

See also
 List of American films of 1974
 The Deadly Bees, a 1966 film
 The Savage Bees, a 1976 TV-movie
 The Swarm, a 1978 film

References

External links
 
 
 Killer Bees at Spout.com
 Killer Bees at MSN Movies

1974 films
1974 television films
American natural horror films
American science fiction horror films
American science fiction television films
American horror television films
ABC Movie of the Week
Films directed by Curtis Harrington
Films scored by David Shire
Films about bees
1970s science fiction horror films
1970s English-language films
1970s American films